Ravindra Samaraweera (or Ravi Samaraweera) is a Sri Lankan politician, the current Cabinet Minister of Labour and Trade Union Relations and former cabinet minister of Wildlife and Sustainable Development  and former state minister of Labor and Trade Union Relations member of the Parliament of Sri Lanka.

Born to a leading political family in the Uva province Samaraweera is a long time United National Party organizer of the Walimada seat and leader of the Badulla District. He was a Deputy Minister in the Ranasinghe Premadasa Cabinet and later a Project minister in the 2001 Ranil Wickramasinghe Government. In 2015 Samaraweera was appointed as minister in the Uva Provincial Council Under Harin Fernando. Samaraweera was also appointed the acting Chief Minister of Uva Province few times in the year 2015 while serving as the minister in the council. In 2018 he was given the cabinet Minister of Wildlife and Sustainable Development.

Samaraweera who was a member of parliament from 1989 to 2010 was re-elected to Parliament in 2015 after his party United National Party won the election to form a government.

Personal life
Samaraweera is the nephew of Percy Samaraweera former Chief Minister of Uva Province. He is married to Sita Samaraweera and they have five children.

References

Year of birth missing (living people)
Living people
Members of the 9th Parliament of Sri Lanka
Members of the 10th Parliament of Sri Lanka
Members of the 11th Parliament of Sri Lanka
Members of the 12th Parliament of Sri Lanka
Members of the 13th Parliament of Sri Lanka
Members of the 15th Parliament of Sri Lanka
Government ministers of Sri Lanka
United National Party politicians
Ministers of state of Sri Lanka